The Jɔgɔ (Jogo) or Numu languages form a branch of the Western Mande languages. They are, 
Ligbi of Ghana
the extinct Tonjon of Ivory Coast
Jeri of Ivory Coast
Ble of Burkina Faso

Kpee of Burkina Faso is similar to Ligbi, but no comparison has been done.

References

Mande languages